Events from the year 2010 in Sweden

Incumbents
 Monarch – Carl XVI Gustaf
 Prime Minister – Fredrik Reinfeldt

Events
 8,9 June 2010 Rinkeby riots, first significant rioting in an immigrant neighborhood
 19 September - 2010 Swedish general election was held, it saw the Nationalist Sweden Democrats entering parliament for the first time, as the sixth largest and only non-aligned of the eight parties elected to the parliament, by receiving 5.70 percent of the votes (an increase by 2.77 pp) and 20 seats.

Deaths

 10 January – Ulf Olsson, convicted murderer (born 1951)
 11 February – Bo Holmberg, governor (born 1942).
 2 March – Emil Forselius, actor (born 1974)
 10 March – Björn von der Esch, politician (born 1930).
 11 March – Walter Aronson, bobsledder (born 1917).
1 April – Anders Eklund, boxer (b. 1957).
9 April – Kerstin Thorvall, author, illustrator and journalist (b. 1925).
24 April – Bo Hansson, keyboardist (b. 1943).

References

 
Years of the 21st century in Sweden